Alver is a crater on Mercury. It has a diameter of 151.49 kilometers. Its name was adopted by the International Astronomical Union (IAU) on March 15, 2013. Alver is named for the Estonian poet Betti Alver.

Alver is one of 110 peak ring basins on Mercury.  It lies in southern Utaridi Planitia.

References

Impact craters on Mercury